Einar Hemming (born 4 April 1893) was a Swedish footballer. Hemming was part of the Djurgården Swedish champions' team of 1917 and 1920. Hemming made 6 appearances for Sweden and scored 0 goals.

Honours

Club 
 Djurgårdens IF 
 Svenska Mästerskapet (2: 1917, 1920

References

External links
 

Swedish footballers
Djurgårdens IF Fotboll players
Sweden international footballers
1893 births
Year of death missing
Association footballers not categorized by position